Jussi Albert Jääskeläinen (born 19 April 1975) is a Finnish football coach and retired footballer who played as a goalkeeper.

During his career, Jääskeläinen most notably represented Bolton Wanderers from 1997 until 2012, making 530 appearances across all competitions. He left Bolton for West Ham United at the end of the 2011–12 season, moving on after three seasons to Wigan Athletic on a free transfer. In his first season with Wigan, he won the League One title. He left Wigan after two seasons to join Indian club ATK, where he retired in 2018.

Jääskeläinen earned 56 caps for the Finland national team, making his debut in 1998 and retiring from international football in 2010.

Club career
Jääskeläinen was born in Mikkeli, and made his Veikkausliiga debut  for MP Mikkeli in 1992, becoming the club's first choice goalkeeper in 1994. In 1996, he moved to VPS Vaasa where he spent two seasons.

Bolton Wanderers
Jääskeläinen was bought by manager Colin Todd for £100,000 for Bolton Wanderers of the Football League First Division in 1997. He soon established himself as the club's first choice keeper, though a cruciate ligament injury ruled him out for half of Bolton's 2000–01 promotion season.

In October 2006 he saved two penalties in one match from Blackburn Rovers' Benni McCarthy and Jason Roberts to secure a 1–0 away win. On 13 May 2007, Jääskeläinen received Bolton's "Player of the Year Award" and also the "Players' Player of the Year Award" after helping Bolton secure a UEFA Cup spot for only the second time in their history. Despite much speculation linking him with a move away from Bolton when his contract expired following the 2007–08 season, Jääskeläinen agreed a new four-year contract on 11 June, which he signed on 9 July.

His 400th appearance came against Manchester City on 2 November 2008, with his 400th start coming six days later against Hull City.  In January 2009 he saved another penalty from Benni McCarthy in a match against Blackburn Rovers, now managed by his former manager Sam Allardyce, to secure a 2–2 draw. After twelve years, Jääskeläinen was granted a testimonial match against Hibernian in August 2009 in which he kept a clean sheet.

His 500th appearance came against Birmingham City on 12 March 2011 in an FA Cup Quarter-Final and his 500th start a week later at Manchester United.

In 2012, in the Premier League 20 Seasons Awards, a double-save from Jääskeläinen against Manchester United on 20 October 2001 came third in a poll deciding the best save in the Premier League's 20-year existence.

At the end of the 2011–12 season Bolton were relegated from the Premier League and Jääskeläinen rejected a two-year contract bringing an end to his 15-year stay with the club. He made 530 appearances in all competitions, putting him joint third in Bolton's all-time appearance list.

West Ham United
On 13 June 2012, West Ham confirmed that Jääskeläinen had agreed personal terms on a one-year deal with an option for a second year. Jääskeläinen was once again reunited with former manager Sam Allardyce, under whom he worked for eight years at Bolton Wanderers. He made his debut for West Ham on 18 August 2012 in a 1–0 win against Aston Villa. On 12 April 2013, the option for contract extension was activated, keeping Jääskeläinen with "the Hammers" until summer 2014. He played all 38 games of West Ham's 2012–13 season, in the Premier League and was named runner-up in the Hammer of the Year. He played 18 games in the next Premier League season before being dropped in January for Adrián.

On 4 June 2014, signed a new one-year contract extension with West Ham keeping him at the club until the end of the 2014–15 season, saying "Physically I feel good and I felt good last season so I hope I can carry on from there." Jääskeläinen played just one game for West Ham in the 2014–15 season, coming on for Carlton Cole after Adrián had been sent-off in a goalless draw at Southampton on 11 February 2015. He was released at the end of the campaign.

Wigan Athletic
After his release from West Ham, Jääskeläinen trialled with Bradford City. On 11 August 2015, he signed a one-year deal with Wigan Athletic, newly relegated to League One. Initially back-up to fellow incomer Richard O'Donnell, he made his debut on 3 October at the age of 40, keeping a clean sheet in a goalless draw with Walsall at the DW Stadium.

On 31 March 2016, after his 15 clean sheets in 32 games helped Wigan onto an 18-match unbeaten run and second place in the table, he extended his contract for another season. Wigan ended the season as champions. Following the end of his contract at the end of the 2016–17 season, with Wigan being relegated back to League One after finishing 23rd, Jaaskelainen was one of four players to be released by Wigan.

ATK
On 1 September 2017, 42-year old Jääskeläinen switched clubs and countries, signing for Indian Super League club ATK. He made his debut three months later in a goalless draw at Jamshedpur FC. On 17 January 2018 he was released after having played as a second choice to Debjit Majumder. Later reports clarified he will remain at the club as a coach, but his playing career had ended.

International career

Jääskeläinen made his debut for Finland on 25 March 1998 against Malta. He was Finland's second choice behind Antti Niemi for years, but after Niemi retired from international football in 2005, Jääskeläinen finally became the Finnish number one.

On 29 October 2009, Jääskeläinen announced his retirement from international football having collected 55 caps for his country. In explaining his decision Jääskeläinen stated that he hoped that it would allow him to prolong his club career. However, on 6 October 2010 Jääskeläinen announced his comeback to national team in a match against Hungary as Otto Fredrikson was unable to play because of an injury but confirmed that this was just a one-off.

Coaching career

In 2018 he was appointed as the goalkeeper coach at Wrexham by manager Sam Ricketts, a former team-mate at Bolton. Due to the speculation over Ricketts' job, Jääskeläinen, alongside Graham Barrow and Carl Darlington, took charge of Wrexham's second round FA Cup match against Newport County on 1 December. The match finished 0–0, meaning a replay would be played. Two days later, the departure of Ricketts was confirmed, and Barrow was named sole caretaker manager until a replacement was found. He left the club on 7 June 2019.

Personal life
Jääskeläinen's eldest son Will Jääskeläinen plays for Woking FC, in the same position, having left Bolton in August 2017 without making a competitive senior appearance. He wears the shirt number 22, the same that his father did during his time at Bolton. 

His youngest son, Emil, plays for Kendal Town.

Career statistics

Club

* includes 2 play off matches

International

Honours
Bolton Wanderers
2001 Football League First Division Play-offs
Football League Cup runner-up: 2003–04

Wigan Athletic
League One: 2015–16

Individual
 Bolton Wanderers F.C. Player of the Year: 2006–2007

National
Finland
Nordic Football Championship: 2000–01

Individual
 Finnish Footballer of the Year: 2007

References

External links

1975 births
Living people
People from Mikkeli
Association football goalkeepers
Finnish footballers
Finland international footballers
Finnish expatriate footballers
Expatriate footballers in England
Finnish expatriate sportspeople in England
Vaasan Palloseura players
Bolton Wanderers F.C. players
West Ham United F.C. players
Veikkausliiga players
Premier League players
English Football League players
Wigan Athletic F.C. players
ATK (football club) players
Indian Super League players
Expatriate footballers in India
Wrexham A.F.C. non-playing staff
Association football goalkeeping coaches
Sportspeople from South Savo